The 1930 Oregon Webfoots football team represented the University of Oregon in the Pacific Coast Conference (PCC) during the 1930 college football season. In their first season under head coach Clarence Spears, the Webfoots compiled a 7–2 record (3–1 against PCC opponents), finished in fourth place in the PCC, and outscored their opponents, 131 to 35. The team played its home games at Hayward Field in Eugene, Oregon.

Schedule

References

Oregon
Oregon Ducks football seasons
Oregon Webfoots football